The sculptor and medalist Amédée Donatien Doublemard was born at Beaurain in Nord and was taught by Francisque Duret. In 1842, he enrolled at the École des Beaux-Arts of Paris and began exhibiting his work at the Paris Salon in 1844. He died in Paris on 20 July 1900.
In 1855 he shared the Prix de Rome with Henri Chapu. This entitled him to study at Rome where he stayed for three years. On his return to Paris, he was kept busy creating busts of the rich and famous of the period. He also completed several important public works such as his La France en deuil déposant une couronne sur la tombe des soldats morts pour sa défense, le 19 janvier 1871 for Saint-Quentin, his monument honouring Bon-Adrien Jeannot de Moncey in Paris and his monument to Camille Desmoulins in Guise in the Aisne. He was named a Chevalier de la Légion d'honneur in 1877 and received a variety of prizes and medals including a silver medal at the 1889 Exposition universelle. Félix Charpentier was a pupil of his. He bequeathed to the Institute his collection of art to assist students preparing to compete for the Prix de Rome.

Works

Funereal work

References

External links

 French version Wikipedia
 Details of statues/monuments in Paris that suffered destruction

1826 births
1900 deaths
Prix de Rome for sculpture
19th-century French sculptors
French male sculptors
19th-century French male artists